The Minneapolis, St. Paul and Sault Ste. Marie Railroad (MStP&SSM)  was a Class I railroad subsidiary of the Canadian Pacific Railway in the Midwestern United States. Commonly known since its opening in 1884 as the Soo Line after the phonetic spelling of Sault, it was merged with several other major CP subsidiaries on January 1, 1961 to form the Soo Line Railroad.

Passenger service 

The Soo Line was never a major carrier of passenger traffic since its route between Chicago and Minneapolis was much longer than the competing Chicago, Milwaukee, St. Paul and Pacific Railroad (Milwaukee Road), Chicago and North Western Railway, and Chicago, Burlington and Quincy Railroad (Burlington Route) routes. It also had no direct access to Milwaukee.

The primary trains operated by the Soo Line were:
 The Laker which operated an overnight service from Chicago's Grand Central Station to Duluth–Superior with a portion to Minneapolis–St. Paul. An additional portion served Ashland, Wisconsin until January 1959. The Laker was discontinued completely on January 15, 1965.
 The Winnipeger which operated overnight between Minneapolis–St. Paul and Winnipeg. It was discontinued in March 1967.
 A Minneapolis–St. Paul to Western Canada service. During the 1920s and 1930s, the Soo Line operated the Soo-Pacific, a summer-only Chicago to Vancouver service with the Canadian Pacific Railway. This later became The Mountaineer, which was then reduced to Minneapolis–St. Paul to Vancouver, before being discontinued in early August 1960. The Mountaineer was a summer-season-only train that carried exclusively sleeping cars but no coaches. During the non-summer months, the train ran as the Soo-Dominion from Minneapolis–St. Paul to Moose Jaw, Saskatchewan, where it was combined into Canadian Pacific's The Dominion transcontinental passenger train. It was cut back to a St. Paul to Portal, North Dakota run after CP discontinued passenger service to Portal at the end of 1960, before being discontinued entirely in December 1963.
 A Minneapolis–St. Paul to Sault Ste. Marie, Michigan overnight train, which was discontinued in March 1959.
Additionally, local trains served Chicago to Minneapolis–St. Paul, Duluth–Superior to Minneapolis–St. Paul, Duluth to Thief River Falls, Minnesota, and some summer-only services which relieved The Mountaineer of the local work along its route.

Presidents 
The Presidents of the Minneapolis, St. Paul and Sault Ste. Marie Railroad were:
 William D. Washburn, 1883–1889
 Thomas Lowry, 1889–1890, 1892–1909
 F. N. Finney, 1890–1892
 Edmund Pennington, 1909–1922
 George Ray Huntington, 1922–1923
 C. T. Jaffray, 1924–1937
 G. W. Webster, 1937–1944
 H. C. Grout, 1944–1949
 G. Allen MacNamara, 1950–1960

Timeline 

 September 29, 1883: A consortium of flour mill owners in Minneapolis form the Minneapolis, Sault Ste. Marie and Atlantic Railway to build a railroad between its two namesake cities to avoid sending shipments through Chicago.
 February 23, 1884: The presidents of the Minneapolis, Sault Ste. Marie and Atlantic Railway and the Northern Pacific Railway sign an agreement allowing the MSSM&A to use in perpetuity NP track and facilities in Minneapolis and granting an entry to Saint Paul Union Depot. NP's board of directors approved the agreement on March 6.
 March 1884: The first construction contracts are awarded for grading  of line starting from a point near Turtle Lake, Wisconsin. President Washburn receives authorization from the board of directors to place orders for rolling stock.
 November 7, 1884: The ceremonial first train departed Minneapolis to tour from there to Bruce, Wisconsin, the extent of the line that had been constructed so far. On its opening for regular service on November 15, the line measured .
 January 5, 1888: The MStP&SSM's first train departed Minneapolis with 102 cars of flour divided into five sections for Boston, New York City, Philadelphia, London, England and Glasgow, Scotland.
 June 11, 1888: The Canadian Pacific Railway acquires control of the Minneapolis, Sault Ste. Marie and Atlantic Railway, consolidating it with the Minneapolis and Pacific Railway, Minneapolis and St. Croix Railway, and Aberdeen, Bismarck and North Western Railway to form the Minneapolis, St. Paul and Sault Ste. Marie Railway.
 1904: The Soo Line acquires the Bismarck, Washburn and Great Falls Railway.
 1908: The Soo Line acquires a majority interest in the Wisconsin Central Railway, and obtains a 99-year lease of the property in 1909.
 1910: The Soo line acquires the Cuyuna Iron Range Railway.
 1913: The Soo Line acquires the Minnesota Northwestern Electric Railway and the Fairmount and Veblen Railway.
 1921: The Soo Line acquires the Wisconsin and Northern Railroad.
 1932: The Wisconsin Central Railway enters receivership.
 December 31, 1937: The Minneapolis, St. Paul and Sault Ste. Marie Railway files for bankruptcy.
 1944: The Wisconsin Central Railway enters bankruptcy.
 September 1, 1944: The Soo Line reorganization takes effect, emerging as the Minneapolis, St. Paul and Sault Ste. Marie Railroad.
 1953: The Valley City Street and Interuban Railway is sold to the Soo Line.
 1954: The Wisconsin Central emerges from its bankruptcy as the Wisconsin Central Railroad.
 January 1, 1961: The Soo Line Railroad is formed through a merger of the Minneapolis, St. Paul and Sault Ste. Marie Railroad, Wisconsin Central Railroad, and Duluth, South Shore and Atlantic Railroad.

Locomotives

Preservation 

A number of the railroad's rolling stock has been preserved in museums across the United States, some in operational condition. This list includes some of the more notable equipment.

Steam locomotives 

 321, restored B class 0-6-0 built in 1887 by Rhode Island Locomotive Works. Later rebuilt as an 0-6-0 tank engine, numbered X-90 and used as a shop switcher. Rebuilt back to a tender engine in preservation.
 346, restored B-4 class 0-6-0 built in 1915 by ALCO.
 353, restored B-4 class 0-6-0 built in 1920 by ALCO.
 440, restored F-8 class 2-8-0 built by ALCO, displayed in Memorial Park in Harvey, North Dakota.
 735, restored H-3 class 4-6-2 built by ALCO, displayed in Roosevelt Park in Minot, North Dakota.
 950, a 2-10-0, the only one of its type owned by Soo Line, displayed in front of the old depot in Ashland, Wisconsin.
 1003, restored L-1 class 2-8-2 built in 1913 by ALCO.
 Soo Line 1024, restored 2-8-2, on display at city hall, Thief River Falls, Minnesota.
 2645, E-25 class 4-6-0 built by Brooks Locomotive Works in 1900 for the Wisconsin Central Railway as their 247.
 2713, restored H-21 class 4-6-2 built in 1913 by ALCO Schenectady. It is located in Veterans Memorial Park in Stevens Point, Wisconsin. With it is Soo Line caboose 99052, built in 1908 for the Wisconsin Central Railway, their 158.
 2714, restored H-22 class 4-6-2 built in 1914 by ALCO Schenectady. It is located in Lakeside Park in Fond du Lac, Wisconsin.
 2718, restored H-23 class 4-6-2 built in 1923 by ALCO.
 2719, restored H-23 class 4-6-2 built in 1923 by ALCO. This locomotive hauled the Soo Line's last steam-powered train in excursion service in 1959.

References

Notes

Bibliography

External links 

 Soo Line Historical and Technical Society
 Soo Line Online
 Soo Line Online: preserved steam locomotives
 A 100-year timeline of the Soo Line Railroad and its predecessors

Soo Line Railroad
Canadian Pacific Railway subsidiaries
Defunct companies based in Minneapolis
Upper Peninsula of Michigan
Former Class I railroads in the United States
Predecessors of the Canadian Pacific Railway
Railway companies established in 1944
Railway companies disestablished in 1961
Defunct Montana railroads
Defunct North Dakota railroads
Defunct South Dakota railroads
Defunct Minnesota railroads
Defunct Wisconsin railroads
Defunct Michigan railroads
Defunct Illinois railroads
Railroads in the Chicago metropolitan area
American companies established in 1944
American companies disestablished in 1961